Peter Barr Sweeny (October 9, 1825 New York City – August 30, 1911 Mahopac, Putnam County, New York) was an American lawyer and politician from New York.

Life
He was the son of James Sweeny, who kept a hotel in Hoboken, New Jersey, and Mary (Barr) Sweeny.

He attended Columbia College, then studied law, was admitted to the bar and practiced law with James T. Brady in New York City.

In 1852, he was appointed Public Administrator. He was New York County District Attorney in 1858, elected on the Democratic ticket in November 1857, but resigned due to ill health.

Sweeny was City Chamberlain and Park Commissioner under Mayor A. Oakey Hall. He became notorious as a central figure in the ring that controlled Tammany Hall, and was depicted prominently in Thomas Nast's cartoons alongside Boss Tweed, Richard B. Connolly and A. Oakey Hall.

With Tweed, he was a director of the Erie Railroad, which became "a gigantic highway of robbery and disgrace". Sweeny was also Director of the Tenth National Bank, in which city funds were deposited. In Nast's cartoons, Tweed and Sweeny were often identified as "Tweeny and Sweed"; in others, Sweeny was identified as "Peter 'Brains' Sweeny". Public indignation over the theft of millions of dollars by the Tweed ring led to the downfall of the Ring in the municipal election of November 7, 1871. Sweeny resigned from public life the following day. In February 1872, Sweeny was indicted but the D.A.'s office decided for nolle prosequi, and Sweeny went to Canada.

In 1877, Sweeny paid $400,000 to New York City in exchange for forgiveness. The fact that the sum was paid in the name of his recently deceased brother, James M. Sweeney, who had been a minor player in the financial operations of the Ring, was widely condemned in the press. On June 7, 1877, the Evening Post wrote, "Of course, nobody will be deceived by this disgraceful and offensive sham. The suit of the people was not against James M. Sweeny ... It is known that he lived by the breath of his brother, that he was but a mere miserable tool".

Sweeny died at the home of his son Arthur Sweeny, Assistant Corporation Counsel of New York City.

Notes

Sources
The New York Civil List compiled by Franklin Benjamin Hough, Stephen C. Hutchins and Edgar Albert Werner (1867; page 531)
Candidates of the Different Parties for the November Election in NYT on October 28, 1857
PETER B. SWEENY DEAD AT 86 in NYT on September 1, 1911

References
Paine, Albert Bigelow (1904). Th. Nast, His period and his pictures. New York: The Macmillan Company.

1825 births
1911 deaths
New York County District Attorneys
Columbia College (New York) alumni
19th-century American politicians
William M. Tweed
Leaders of Tammany Hall